English Bay Launch is a privately owned and operated water taxi service in the Lower Mainland, British Columbia, Canada, which replaced Granville Island Water Taxi Services in the Fall of 2009. It is one of three water taxi services connecting Bowen Island to Vancouver with regularly scheduled service. It also offers on demand charter services around the greater Vancouver area. It operates an enclosed 27-foot Eagle Craft vessel named The Eagle 14.  Passengers are allowed to bring bicycles on board.

Stops
Regularly scheduled routes operated between stops at the following locations:
Granville Island
Coal Harbour
Snug Cove

See also
 Aquabus - operates passenger ferries from Granville Island
 False Creek Ferries - operates passenger ferries from Granville Island

References

External links
English Bay Launch

Transport in Greater Vancouver
Tourism in Vancouver
Ferries of British Columbia